Hunker may refer to:

 Hunker, Pennsylvania, United States; a borough
 19788 Hunker, a main-belt asteroid
 Jeffrey Hunker (1957-2013), an American cybersecurity expert and writer
 Hunkers, a faction of the Democratic Party in New York, United States during the mid-19th century
 Hunkering

See also

 
 
 Hunk (disambiguation)